PPPPPP, Pppppp, or pppppp may refer to:
 PPPPPP (manga), a manga series serialized in Weekly Shōnen Jump in 2021
 PPPPPP, the soundtrack of the video game VVVVVV
 Pppppp, a book of selected works by Kurt Schwitters, translated by Jerome Rothenberg and Pierre Joris
 pppppp, a rarely used musical dynamic notation for an extremely quiet sound

See also 
 6P (disambiguation)
 PPPPPPP, a United States military acronym for "Proper Prior Planning Prevents Piss Poor Performance"
 Seven Ps, a term in marketing